BATS may refer to:

 BATS Global Markets, a stock exchange
 BATS Improv, an improvisational theatre company in San Francisco
 BATS Theatre, a New Zealand theatre venue
 Bermuda Atlantic Time-series Study, oceanographic study in the Atlantic Ocean
 British American Tobacco, by stock symbol on the London Stock Exchange
 Broadly Applicable Tracking System, a tool scientists used to track bats and other animals.

See also
 Bats (disambiguation)